Harney Park is a  park at the intersection of Southeast 67th Avenue and Harney Street, in Portland, Oregon's Brentwood-Darlington neighborhood, in the United States.

Description
The park, named after William S. Harney, was acquired in 1979. The Oregonian  Anna Griffin described the park as a "postage stamp-sized swath of green, a former vacant lot and eyesore that neighbors pushed to turn into a park". Features include a basketball court, playground, soccer field, and softball diamond. It has hosted a climbing wall, as well as Movies in the Park, and was one of 30 parks announced to receive basketball court improvements as part of a $1 million project funded by Nike Inc. and the Portland Trail Blazers in 2018.

See also

 List of parks in Portland, Oregon

References

1979 establishments in Oregon
Brentwood-Darlington, Portland, Oregon
Parks in Portland, Oregon
Protected areas established in 1979